Lieutenant-General Sir Henry William Stisted  (5 June 1817 – 10 December 1875), served as the first Lieutenant Governor of Ontario after Confederation, from 1867 to 1868.

Biography
Born 1817, at St-Omer, France, to Lt.-Colonel Charles Stisted (1786–1842) of the 3rd The King's Own Hussars, by his wife Eliza Maria (b.1787 Bengal, India) d. 1822 Ipswich, UK,) daughter of Major-General William Burn (c1745–1814) of Exeter, Devon.

After being educated at Sandhurst, he entered the army as an ensign in the 2nd foot on 4 December 1835, and served with his regiment in Afghanistan and Beloochistan, taking part in the storming of Ghuznee, where he was wounded at the gateway, the capture of Khelat, and the occupation of Kabul, for which he received a medal. On 19 April 1850 he was gazetted lieutenant-colonel of the 78th foot, and in the Persian war of 1856 and 1857 commanded a brigade in the night attack and battle of Kooshat, and took charge of his own regiment at the bombardment of Mohamrah, after which he received the thanks of the governor-general as well as a medal and clasps. He commanded the advanced guard of Havelock's force at the relief of Lucknow, 25 September 1857, when, upon the death in battle of Brigadier-general James George Smith Neill, he was appointed to command the first brigade. That post he held until the close of the operations, when on 1 January 1858 he was nominated C.B. In that year he served also in Rohilcund and commanded the second brigade at the battle of Bareilly on 7 May.

He became lieutenant-colonel of the 93rd foot on 30 September 1859 and served with the field force against the mountain tribes on the north-west frontier of India in December 1863. He was appointed Major General in 1864 and divisional commander of British forces in Canada in 1866 and appointed Lieutenant Governor of Ontario in June 1867. He was instrumental in opening up the northern part of the province for development. For his services in this capacity he received the thanks of the governor-general of Canada and was nominated a K.C.B. on 20 May 1871. On 5 February 1873, he was appointed a lieutenant-general and was nominated colonel of the 93rd foot on 28 September 1873.

He died at Wood House, Upper Norwood, Surrey, on 10 December 1875. In 1845, at Florence, he had married Maria Katherine Eliza Burton (1823–1894), sister of explorer Sir Richard Francis Burton. Their daughter, Georgiana Martha Stisted (1846–1903), published The True Life of Captain Sir Richard Burton.

He was buried at West Norwood Cemetery, London, and is the only Lieutenant Governor of Ontario not buried in Canada.

References
Attribution

External links 
Biography at the Dictionary of Canadian Biography Online

1817 births
1875 deaths
British military personnel of the First Anglo-Afghan War
British military personnel of the Anglo-Persian War
British military personnel of the Indian Rebellion of 1857
British Army generals
Burials at West Norwood Cemetery
Graduates of the Royal Military College, Sandhurst
Knights Commander of the Order of the Bath
Lieutenant Governors of Ontario
Queen's Royal Regiment officers
93rd Regiment of Foot officers